Reino Börjesson (born 4 February 1929) is a Swedish former professional footballer who played as a midfielder for Jonsereds IF, IFK Göteborg, Norrby IF, and Örgryte IS. He played ten international matches for Sweden and participated in the 1958 FIFA World Cup Final when Sweden lost 5–2 to Brazil.

Personal life
Börjesson was born to a Swedish father, footballer Erik Börjesson, and Finnish mother, Hilja.

References

1929 births
Living people
Association football midfielders
Swedish footballers
Sweden international footballers
1958 FIFA World Cup players
Allsvenskan players
Jonsereds IF players
IFK Göteborg players
Norrby IF players
Örgryte IS players
Swedish people of Finnish descent